Cassandra Rose Clarke (born 1983) is an American author who writes speculative fiction novels.

Education
Clarke graduated from the University of St. Thomas in 2006 with a bachelor's degree in English.
She received a master's degree in creative writing from the University of Texas at Austin in 2008.
She was selected for the Clarion West Writers Workshop in 2010.

Writing style
Clarke writes speculative fiction novels.
Clarke's works have been praised, with particular emphasis on her skill in worldbuilding: Publishers Weekly called Our Lady of the Ice "complex and lovely" with "worldbuilding [that] will sweep readers away."
The worldbuilding in The Mad Scientist's Daughter was done with "a very light and deft touch" according to Kirkus Reviews.

Works
The Mad Scientist's Daughter (2013)
Our Lady of the Ice (2015)
Magic of Blood and Sea (2017): A compilation of two of Clarke's earlier novels, The Assassin's Curse (2012) and The Pirate's Wish (2013)
Magic of Wind and Mist (2017): A compilation of two of Clarke's earlier novels, The Wizard’s Promise (2014) and The Nobleman’s Revenge (previously unpublished)
The Witch Who Came in from the Cold: A serial fiction piece coauthored with Max Gladstone, Lindsay Smith, Ian Tregillis, and Michael Swanwick.
Star's End (2017)
Halo: Battle Born (2019)
Halo: Meridian Divide (2019)

Awards
In 2010, Clarke was a recipient of the Susan C. Petrey Clarion Scholarship Fund.
In 2013, she was a finalist for the Philip K. Dick Award.
She has also been nominated for the Young Adult Library Services Association Best Fiction for Young Adults Award.

References

1983 births
Living people
21st-century American novelists
Speculative fiction writers
American women novelists
21st-century American women writers